Roland Theis (1980) is a German politician of the Christian Democrat Union. Since 2017 he has been serving as State Secretary  in the State Ministry of Justice in Saarland, in the government of Minister-President Tobias Hans.

Education and early career
After his studies in the field of law and politics in the University of Saarland and the Université d'Aix-Marseille III he gained his first law degree in 2005 and second in 2008. He is a scholarship holder from the Konrad Adenauer Foundation and is currently working as a lecturer of constitutional and media law in the University of Saarland. Theis is the alumnus of the Marshall Memorial Fellowship of the German Marshall Fund and the American Jewish Committee.

Following his studies, Theis worked as a lawyer at SaarLB.

Political career
Theis was the chairman of the Junge Union in Saarland from 2005–2010 and is still the vice chairman of the International Commission of the Junge Union in Germany.

Theis was a member of the city council of Ottweiler and the district council of Neunkirchen from 2004 until 2009. In his home town Ottweiler he is the chairman of the local CDU association.

In the 2009 state elections, Theis ran for Landtag as a member of CDU and was elected as a representative. He was elected as Secretary General of the CDU in Saarland in November 2010, after the board had appointed him to the position already in November 2009; in this capacity, he assisted chairwoman Annegret Kramp-Karrenbauer. In the current legislative period Theis is his parliamentary group's spokesman in issues concerning judicial, media and economical politics. In addition he is also the chairman of the committee of inquiry for Landtags elections of 2009.

References

1980 births
Living people
Members of the Landtag of Saarland
Paul Cézanne University alumni
Saarland University alumni
Jurists from Saarland